Beni Gassenbauer (born 1949) is a French-born Israeli watercolor artist.

Biography
Beni Gassenbauer was born in France. He immigrated to Israel and has lived in and around Jerusalem since 1976. Gassenbauer paints landscapes of Jerusalem and the Mediterranean countryside.  He works in watercolor on paper.

Website: www.beni-gassenbauer.com

Next solo exhibitions 
 2020 Jerusalem Theatre, 23/2 until 22/3/2020
 2020 Ming Gallery of Art, Suzhou, China: 28/3 until 12/4/2020
 2021 Galerie de l'Hopital, Morges, Switzerland: Nov-Dec 2021

Solo exhibitions 
 2018 La Prairie, Yverdon-les-Bains, Switzerland
 2018 Mas des Ecureuils, Aix en Provence, France
 2018  Sebastopol Gallery, Marseille, France
 2018 Revivim Eshkol Pais Center, Rishon LeZion, Israel
 2018 Eshkol Pais Arts Science Technology, Ramla, Israel
 2017  Ephrat Gallery, Tel Aviv
 2017  Ming Gallery of Art, Suzhou, China
 2017  Noyart, V Tower, Bnei Brak, Israel
 2016  Galerie de l'Hopital, Morges, Switzerland
 2016  Quanhua Watercolor Art Gallery, Zhujiajiao, Shanghai, China
 2015 Jerusalem Theatre; "A touch of color and light"
 2014  IsraeliArtMarket, solo exhibition
 2013 Matsart Gallery, Tel Aviv
 2013 CHUV, Lausanne, Switzerland
 2012 Private exhibition, Lausanne, Switzerland
 2012 Jerusalem International YMCA
 2011 Private exhibition, Lausanne, Switzerland
 2010 Niederhauser Gallery, Lausanne, Switzerland
 1999 Mayanot Gallery, Jerusalem 
 1998 Aktuarius Gallery, Strasbourg, France
1997 Safrai Gallery, Jerusalem
 1996 Aktuarius Gallery, Strasbourg, France
 1995 Dufresnoy Center, Paris
 1994 Safrai Gallery, Jerusalem
 1992 Safrai Gallery, Tel Aviv
 1991 Jerusalem International YMCA

International exhibitions 
 2019 1st Olympiart, IWS India, New Delhi, India
 2019 Re-Interpretation Zhuhai International Watercolor Exhibition, Zhuhai, China
 2019 The 6th Silk Road International Art Exhibition, Xi 'An, China
 2019 Fabriano in Acquarello, Fabriano, Italy
 2019 World Watercolor Masters, Gouda, Holland
 2019 II International Triennial Watercolor & Spirit- Varna 2019, Bulgaria
 2019 Guangzhou International Watercolor Invitational Exhibition, Guangzhou, China
 2019 Taicang International Watercolor Invitational Exhibition, Taicang. China
 2018 the 23rd Guangzhou International Art Fair, Guangzhou, China
 2018 Jinji Lake Art Museum, Suzhou, China
 2018 A.R.T. Taipei, Taiwan
 2018 European Contemporary Watercolor Exhibition in China: HKE Art Museum, Ningbo, China
 2018 Chan Liu Art Museum, Taipei, Taiwan
 2018 Jiaxing International Watercolor Exhibition, Jiaxing, China
 2017  X-Power Gallery, Taipei, Taiwan
 2017  Watercolor Salon II, Thessaloniki, Greece
 2017 Ningbo International City Arts Expo, China 
 2017 International Watercolor Exhibition, Ming Gallery of Art, Suzhou, China
 2017 Anshan International Watercolor Exhibition, Anshan, China: at the Liren Art Gallery
 2017 4th Silk Road International Art Festival, Xi An, China
 2017 Lingang (Shanghai) International Watercolor Exhibition, China: at the Lingang Contemporary Art Museum
 2017 Re-Interpretation International Contemporary Watercolor Exhibition, Shanghai, China: at the Tian Zi Fang Art Center
 2017 The World of watercolor, International Watercolor Exhibition, Bratislava, Slovakia
 2017 Re-Interpretation International Watercolor Exhibition, Shanghai, China: at the Cheng Kai Center
 2017 International Watercolor Invitational Exhibition, Jiang Yin, China
 2017 A.R.T. Taipei 2017, Taiwan
 2017  2nd Tirana International Watercolor Biennale, Tirana, Albania
 2017 Re-interpretation overseas artists' watercolor exhibition in Shanghai, China
 2016 1st Nanning China International Watercolor Invitational Exhibition, Nanning, China
 2016  Watercolor International III, Thessaloniki, Greece
 2016 1st International Watercolor Biennale, Bangkok, Thailand
 2016 "Re-Interpretation" International Contemporary Watercolor Invitational Exhibition, Chen Zhifo Art Museum, Cixi, Zhejiang Province, China
 2016 "Re-Interpretation" International Contemporary Watercolor Invitational Exhibition, Meibo Art Center, Shanghai,    China
 2016  1st. International Watercolor Triennial, Varna, Bulgaria
 2016  1st International Watercolour Biennale, Vanvouver BC, Canada
 2016 "Re-Interpretation 2016" International Contemporary Watercolor Exhibition: at the Ming Gallery of Art, Suzhou, China
 2016  Large Size, International Watercolor Exhibition, Mexico City
 2016 1st. International Watercolor Festival-Spain, Ubeda, Andalucia, Spain
 2016 "Re-Interpretation 2016" International Contemporary Watercolor Exhibition; at the Taicang Museum, China
 2015  Watercolor Salon of Thessaloniki, Greece: at the Piraeus Bank Convention Center
 2015  "Re-Interpretation 2015" International Contemporary Watercolor Exhibition, J&Z Gallery, Shenzhen, China  - 2015  VIZart, International Watercolor Festival, Tirana, Albania
 2015 "Re- Interpretation 2015" Watercolour Exhibition at the 18th West Lake International Art Fair, Hangzhou, China
 2015 Castra 2015 International Watercolour Biennal / Ajdovščina / Slovenia
 2015  The World Watercolor Triennale, Seoul, South Korea
 2015 "Re-Interpretation 2015" International Contemporary Watercolour Exhibition at Guilin Zhongyong Art Museum, Guilin, China
 2015 "Re-Interpretation 2015" show at Shanghai No 1 Art Museum, Jianguo Zhong Road, Shanghai, China
 2014-2015 Qingdao International Watercolor Bienniale 2014, China: at Qingdao Art Museum
 2014  Zhujiajiao International Watercolour Biennial–Art Center, Shanghai: "Re-interpretation", The International  Watercolour   Exhibition in China.
 2014  Shanghai Textile and Fashion Museum: "Re-interpretation", The International Watercolour Exhibition in        China.
 2014  Watermedia International Thessaloniki, Myro Gallery, Thessaloniki, Greece
 2014  Festival International de l'Aquarelle, Aiguillon, France
 2014  China Sculpture Gallery Qingdao: "Re-interpretation", The International Watercolour Exhibition in China
 2014  Suzhou Art Museum, China:  "Re-interpretation", The International Watercolour Exhibition in China
 2014  Taicang (City) Museum, China: "Re-interpretation", The International Watercolour Exhibition in China
 2014  The World Watermedia Exposition, Thailand at Ratchadamnoen Contemporary Art Center, Bangkok

Group exhibitions 

 2018 Jerusalem International YMCA
 2018 Three Rivers Art Project, Elbaz Studio Gallery NY, Hudson, New York
 2018 AACEM, Hang'art, Marseille, France
 2016 Gallerina: collective exhibition
 2016 Noyart, "3 pine cones", collective exhibition, B.S.R. Tower 2, Bnei Brak
 2015  Landscape and People: Jerusalem Cinematheque
 2015  May 16:  Art&Twist Art Auction at Suzanne Dellal Center, Tel Aviv
 2015  March 3:  Art&Twist Art Auction at Suzanne Dellal Center, Tel Aviv
 2014 Jerusalem Theatre: Plant still life
 2014 Noyart, Yokneam, Israel
 2014 Surmrit Gallery of Art and Design, New York
 2014 Noyart, Azrieli Towers, Tel Aviv
 2014 Noyart, Azrieli Towers, Tel Aviv
 1998  Artexpo, New York
 1993  Jerusalem International YMCA
 1991  Jerusalem Artists House
 Suzanne Dellal Center for Dance and Theater, Neve Tzedek Quarter, Tel Aviv

References

External links 
Beni Gassenbauer
Exhibition video

Israeli painters
Israeli watercolourists
French watercolourists
1949 births
Living people